The Beastles is the name of a fictional band created by dj BC. The music is a mashup of music from the Beatles and the Beastie Boys.

dj BC received both acclaim and controversy after the release of the self-made album 2004 dj BC presents The Beastles, which was removed at the request of Apple Corps, the owner of all The Beatles' intellectual property, including their recordings. In 2006 he went on to produce a second album named Let It Beast, with cover art by cartoonist Josh Neufeld.

Critical attention
The Boston Phoenix named dj BC as Boston's Best Lawbreaker, the Detroit Metro Times marked dj BC presents The Beastles as one of the best of 2004, and dj BC was featured in Newsweek, and Rolling Stone.

Discography

"2 Many Beastles" (single)
Samples:
"Taxman" by The Beatles
"Too Many Rappers" by The Beastie Boys

dj BC presents The Beastles (2004)

"Whatcha Want, Lady?" – 3:49
Samples:
"Lady Madonna" by The Beatles
"So What'cha Want" by The Beastie Boys
"Tripper Trouble" – 3:01
Samples:
"Day Tripper" by The Beatles
"Triple Trouble" by The Beastie Boys
"Three Is a Magic Number" from Schoolhouse Rock
"Mother Nature's Rump" – 3:34
Samples:
"Mother Nature's Son" by The Beatles
"Shake Your Rump" by The Beastie Boys
"I Feel Fine Right Now" – 3:02
Samples:
"I Feel Fine" by The Beatles
"Right Right Now Now" by The Beastie Boys
"Sure-Bla-Di Shot-Bla-Da" – 3:23
Samples:
"Ob-La-Di, Ob-La-Da" by The Beatles
"Sure Shot" by The Beastie Boys
"Mad World Forever" – 3:24
Samples:
"Strawberry Fields Forever" by The Beatles
"In A World Gone Mad" by The Beastie Boys
"Word To The Mic" – 3:08
Samples:
"The Word" by The Beatles
"Pass the Mic" by The Beastie Boys
"Root Down Reprise" – 2:46
Samples:
"Sgt. Pepper's Lonely Hearts Club Band (Reprise)" by The Beatles
"Root Down" by The Beastie Boys
"Hold It Together Now" – 4:43
Samples:
"Come Together" by The Beatles
"Hold It Now, Hit It" by The Beastie Boys

Let It Beast (2006)

"Ladies Do Love Me" – 3:34
Samples:
"Love Me Do" by The Beatles
"Hey Ladies" by The Beastie Boys
"Belly Movin'" – 3:12
Samples:
"The Inner Light" by The Beatles
"Body Movin'" by The Beastie Boys
"Building My Life" – 2:38
Samples:
"In My Life" by The Beatles
"It Takes Time To Build" by The Beastie Boys
"Electrified Kite" – 2:01
Samples:
"Being For The Benefit Of Mr. Kite!" by The Beatles
"Electrify" by The Beastie Boys
"Let it Beast" – 3:24
Samples:
"Let It Be" by The Beatles
"The Negotiation Limerick File" by The Beastie Boys
"Lovely NYC" – 3:12
Samples:
"Lovely Rita" by The Beatles
"Yellow Submarine" by The Beatles
"An Open Letter To NYC" by The Beastie Boys
"Anna's MCs" – 3:54
Samples:
"Anna (Go to Him)" by The Beatles
"Crawlspace" by The Beastie Boys
"Love You To Check It Out" – 3:46
Samples:
"Love You To" by The Beatles
"Ch-Check It Out" by The Beastie Boys
"Looking Down The Barrel Of A Warm Gun" – 2:41
Samples:
"Happiness Is a Warm Gun" by The Beatles
"Looking Down the Barrel of a Gun" by The Beastie Boys
"A Day in The Life of A Beastie Boy" – 2:20
Samples:
"A Day in the Life" by The Beatles
"Get Back" by The Beatles
"Groove Holmes" by The Beastie Boys
"Mark On The Bus" by The Beastie Boys

Ill Submarine (2013)
No Sleep Till the Sun Comes Up
Move Prudence
Ill Submarine
Drive My Car, Thief!
OK Nowhere Man
Do You Know an Intergalactic Secret?
The Michelle Diamond Brouhaha
Can't Buy Me Rhymes
Hello FU Goodbye
Brrthday
Beastles Flying in The Cut
Twist That Train
Hide a Little Something Away
Crazy-Ass Revolution
Mean Old Men
Say It, Martha
Glasses From The Night Before
Get It All Together Now
Party Lane Shazam
Don't Let MCA Down

See also
 The Grey Album

References

External links

American parodists
Tribute bands
Parody musicians
The Beatles tribute bands
Mashup albums
The Beatles bootleg recordings
2004 remix albums
Self-released albums
The Beatles remix albums
Beastie Boys remix albums
Unofficial remix albums